Fernanda Botelho (December 1, 1926 – December 11, 2007) was a Portuguese writer.

She was born in Oporto and was educated at the University of Coimbra and the University of Lisbon. In 1951, she published her first collection of poems As Coordenadas Líricas (Lyrical coordinates). This was followed by a series of novels. Her fiction was influenced by the French nouveau roman.

Botelho died in Lisbon at the age of 74.

Selected works 
 Ângulo Raso (Flat angle), novel (1957)
 Calendário Privado (Private calendar), novel (1958)
 A Gata e a Fábula (The cat and the fable), novel (1960), received the Prémio Camilo Castelo Branco
 Xerazade e os outros (Scheherazade and the Others), novel (1964)
 Lourenço É Nome de Jogral (Lourenço is a minstrel's name) (1971)
 Esta Noite Sonhei com Brughel (Tonight I dream of Breughel), novel (1987)
 As Contadoras de Historias (The Women Storytellers) (1998), received the Portuguese Writers Association Prize

References 

1926 births
2007 deaths
Portuguese novelists
20th-century Portuguese poets
Portuguese women poets
20th-century Portuguese novelists
20th-century Portuguese women writers